Khai D. T. Ngo is a Professor of electrical and computer engineering at Virginia Tech in Blacksburg, Virginia. He was named a Fellow of the Institute of Electrical and Electronics Engineers (IEEE) in 2015 for his contributions to the unified synthesis and modeling of switched-mode converters.

Ngo obtained B.S. degree from California State Polytechnic University, Pomona in 1979. He then got his M.S. and Ph.D. degrees from the California Institute of Technology in 1980 and 1984, respectively, all of which were in electrical and electronic engineering.

References

External links

ECE profile

20th-century births
Living people
American electrical engineers
Computer engineers
California State Polytechnic University, Pomona alumni
California Institute of Technology alumni
Virginia Tech faculty
21st-century American engineers
Fellow Members of the IEEE
Year of birth missing (living people)
Place of birth missing (living people)